The 1983 UCI Track Cycling World Championships were the World Championship for track cycling. They took place in Zurich, Switzerland in 1983. Fourteen events were contested, 12 for men (5 for professionals, 7 for amateurs) and 2 for women.

Medal summary

Medal table

See also
 1983 UCI Road World Championships

References

Track cycling
UCI Track Cycling World Championships by year
International cycle races hosted by Switzerland
1983 in track cycling
Sport in Zürich
20th century in Zürich